= Chhapri =

- village
- Location within Madhya Pradesh Location within India
- Coordinates: 23.161241°N 77.318313°E
- Country: India
- State: Madhya Pradesh
- District: Bhopal
- Tehsil: Huzur

Population (2011)
  - Total: 767
- Time zone: UTC+5:30 (IST)
- ISO 3166 code: MP-IN
- Census code: 482519

Chhapri is a village in the Bhopal district of Madhya Pradesh, India. It is located in the Huzur tehsil and the Phanda block.

== Demographics ==
According to the 2011 census of India, Chhapri has 163 households. The effective literacy rate (i.e. the literacy rate of population excluding children aged 6 and below) is 67.35%.

Demographics (2011 Census)
	Total	Male	Female
Population	767	419	348
Children aged below 6 years	130	83	47
Scheduled caste	156	88	68
Scheduled tribe	269	151	118
Literates	429	241	188
Workers (all)	254	188	66
Main workers (total)	237	176	61
Main workers: Cultivators	24	22	2
Main workers: Agricultural labourers	28	22	6
Main workers: Household industry workers	5	4	1
Main workers: Other	180	128	52
Marginal workers (total)	17	12	5
Marginal workers: Cultivators	0	0	0
Marginal workers: Agricultural labourers	2	2	0
Marginal workers: Household industry workers	0	0	0
Marginal workers: Others	15	10	5
Non-workers	513	231	282
